Holcoderus is a genus of beetles in the family Carabidae, containing the following species:

 Holcoderus aeripennis Andrewes, 1931 
 Holcoderus alacer Andrewes, 1937 
 Holcoderus brunnescens (Jedlicka, 1935) 
 Holcoderus caeruleipennis Sloane, 1910 
 Holcoderus carinatus Andrewes, 1933 
 Holcoderus chrysomeloides Andrewes, 1930 
 Holcoderus decolor Darlington, 1970 
 Holcoderus dentatus Louwerens, 1949 
 Holcoderus elegans Louwerens, 1958 
 Holcoderus elongatus (Saunders, 1863) 
 Holcoderus fissus Andrewes, 1933 
 Holcoderus formosanus Jedlicka, 1940
 Holcoderus gloriosus Andrewes, 1931 
 Holcoderus gracilis (Oberthur, 1883) 
 Holcoderus marginalis Louwerens, 1949 
 Holcoderus niger Andrewes, 1937 
 Holcoderus obscurus Habu, 1979 
 Holcoderus ophthalmicus Louwerens, 1953 
 Holcoderus overbecki Emden, 1937 
 Holcoderus praemorsus Chaudoir, 1869 
 Holcoderus puncticeps Andrewes, 1930 
 Holcoderus quadrifoveatus Louwerens, 1951 
 Holcoderus quadripunctatus Louwerens, 1956 
 Holcoderus smaragdinus Andrewes, 1926 
 Holcoderus superbus Andrewes, 1933 
 Holcoderus trichias Andrewes, 1930

References

Lebiinae